In Greek mythology, Peisander or Pisander (Ancient Greek: Πείσανδρος Peisandros) may refer to the following characters:

 Pisander, also called Isander, a Lycian prince as son of Bellerophon and Philonoe, daughter of King Iobates. In some accounts, his mother was known as Alkimedousa, Anticleia, Pasandra or Cassandra. Pisander's siblings were Hippolochus (father of Glaucus) and Laodamia (also called Deidamia or Hippodamia, mother of Sarpedon by Zeus). He was slain by Ares, as he fought against the Solymi, a Lycian tribe.
 Pisander, an Achaean soldier commanded a company of Myrmidons. He was the son of Maemalus.
 Pisander, a Trojan warrior and son of Antimachus. He was the brother of Hippolochus, Hippomachus, and Tisiphone. During the Trojan War, Pisander and Hippolochus asked Agamemnon for mercy and to be taken prisoner alive, saying that their rich father would pay a ransom for him. They were nevertheless slain by Agamemnon.
 Pisander, another Trojan soldier who was killed by Menelaus.
 Pisander, a native of Abydos in Troad and the father of Maenalus, a Trojan warrior.
 Pisander, son of Polyctor and one of the suitors of Penelope from Same along with other 22 wooers. He was slain by Philoetius during the assault of Odysseus.

See also 
 Jovian asteroid 248183 Peisandros, named after the Trojan warrior killed by Agamemnon

Notes

References 

 Apollodorus, The Library with an English Translation by Sir James George Frazer, F.B.A., F.R.S. in 2 Volumes, Cambridge, MA, Harvard University Press; London, William Heinemann Ltd. 1921. ISBN 0-674-99135-4. Online version at the Perseus Digital Library. Greek text available from the same website.
Diodorus Siculus, The Library of History translated by Charles Henry Oldfather. Twelve volumes. Loeb Classical Library. Cambridge, Massachusetts: Harvard University Press; London: William Heinemann, Ltd. 1989. Vol. 3. Books 4.59–8. Online version at Bill Thayer's Web Site
Diodorus Siculus, Bibliotheca Historica. Vol 1-2. Immanel Bekker. Ludwig Dindorf. Friedrich Vogel. in aedibus B. G. Teubneri. Leipzig. 1888-1890. Greek text available at the Perseus Digital Library.
Homer, The Iliad with an English Translation by A.T. Murray, Ph.D. in two volumes. Cambridge, MA., Harvard University Press; London, William Heinemann, Ltd. 1924. . Online version at the Perseus Digital Library.
Homer, Homeri Opera in five volumes. Oxford, Oxford University Press. 1920. . Greek text available at the Perseus Digital Library.
Homer, The Odyssey with an English Translation by A.T. Murray, PH.D. in two volumes. Cambridge, MA., Harvard University Press; London, William Heinemann, Ltd. 1919. . Online version at the Perseus Digital Library. Greek text available from the same website.
 Pseudo-Clement, Recognitions from Ante-Nicene Library Volume 8, translated by Smith, Rev. Thomas. T. & T. Clark, Edinburgh. 1867. Online version at theio.com
Quintus Smyrnaeus, The Fall of Troy translated by Way. A. S. Loeb Classical Library Volume 19. London: William Heinemann, 1913. Online version at theio.com
 Quintus Smyrnaeus, The Fall of Troy. Arthur S. Way. London: William Heinemann; New York: G.P. Putnam's Sons. 1913. Greek text available at the Perseus Digital Library.
Strabo, The Geography of Strabo. Edition by H.L. Jones. Cambridge, Mass.: Harvard University Press; London: William Heinemann, Ltd. 1924. Online version at the Perseus Digital Library.
Strabo, Geographica edited by A. Meineke. Leipzig: Teubner. 1877. Greek text available at the Perseus Digital Library.

Princes in Greek mythology
Lycians
Achaeans (Homer)
Trojans
Suitors of Penelope
Characters in the Odyssey
Lycia